Chester Arthur Brewer (January 14, 1907 – March 26, 1990) was an American right-handed pitcher in baseball's Negro leagues. Born in Leavenworth, Kansas, he played for the Kansas City Monarchs, and from 1957 to 1974 he scouted for the Pittsburgh Pirates.

Brewer toiled on the mounds of black baseball for twenty-four years with an assortment of teams throughout the world, including China, Japan, the Philippines, Hawaii, Canada, Mexico, Panama, Puerto Rico, Haiti, Santo Domingo, and in forty-four of the forty-eight continental United States.

While with the Kansas City Monarchs, Brewer was a part of legendary starting rotations including Satchel Paige and Bullet Rogan. Brewer had a lively fastball and a devastating overhand "drop ball," which was especially tough on left-handed hitters. He also threw an emery ball (learned from Emory Osborne and Ted "Double Duty" Radcliffe.) when such practice was legal.

Brewer's career covered a wide experiential range, including playing against major leaguers in exhibition games. In 1934 he pitched against an all-star team that included Jimmie Foxx and Heinie Manush, and later was manager of the Kansas City Royals, who played in the California Winter League against Bob Feller and other major leaguers.  In 1945, he managed the Kansas City Royals of the California Winter League, coaching among other players a young Jackie Robinson, already destined for the Brooklyn Dodgers' organization.

In 1952 Brewer was a player-manager for the Porterville Comets of the Southwest International League,
becoming one of the first black managers in Minor League Baseball history, as he joined Sam Bankhead, who a year earlier played and managed for the Farnham Pirates of the Provincial League. At 45, Brewer posted a 6–5 record in 24 pitching appearances (seven starts), posting a 3.38 ERA for the fourth-best in the league.
1985-1990 Chet Brewer and his staff also coached Los Angeles Inner City athletes on weekends, players such as: George Hendrick, Ellis Valentine, Reggie Smith, infielder turned CBS Sports Broadcaster Rich Perez and Don Newcombe’s son participated as well. 

Hall of Fame hopeful, Chet Brewer died at age 83 in Whittier, California.

Notes and references

External links
 and Seamheads
Baseball Hall of Fame candidate biography

1907 births
1990 deaths
African-American baseball managers
Alijadores de Tampico players
American expatriate baseball players in Mexico
Baseball players from Kansas
Brooklyn Royal Giants players
Chicago American Giants players
Cleveland Buckeyes players
Kansas City Monarchs players
Louisville Buckeyes players
Minor league baseball managers
New York Cubans players
Sportspeople from Leavenworth, Kansas
Philadelphia Stars players
Pittsburgh Crawfords players
Porterville Comets players
Visalia Cubs players
Washington Pilots players
American expatriate baseball players in Panama
Carman Cardinals players
American expatriate baseball players in Canada
20th-century African-American sportspeople
Diablos Rojos del México players